Scooby-Doo! Legend of the Phantosaur is a 2011, direct-to-video film based on Scooby-Doo. The film was released on September 6, 2011. It premiered on Cartoon Network on September 3, 2011.

Plot

Shaggy discovers he has a disorder which causes him to unhealthily overreact to anything frightening, putting an end to Mystery Inc. The gang takes him to a spa resort in the town of La Serena to calm his nerves. While the gang meets the resort owner, Mr. Hubley, Scooby-Doo has a run-in with a dinosaur and keeps it to himself to spare Shaggy's fears.  The gang soon meets Professor Svankmajer and her student Winsor, the paleontologists in charge of an archaeological dig, before they see a large "ghost dinosaur". Scooby rescues Shaggy, paralyzed by fear, and is subsequently chased by the dinosaur until they are saved by Fred, who knocks the dinosaur off of a cliff while driving the Mystery Machine.

Mr. Hubley tells the legend of the "Phantosaur": a phantom dinosaur summoned by Native Americans to regain their land stolen by European colonists. Mr. Hubley hypnotizes Shaggy into being confident and fearless so long as he hears a keyword, the same word of which will return Shaggy to his original state of mind. However, no one, including Mr. Hubley and Shaggy, remembers what the keyword is.

At the dig site entrance, Daphne, Fred, and Velma notice dinosaur tracks and potential snake tracks. Meanwhile, at a buffet, Shaggy upsets a gang of bikers who threaten him but in doing so say the keyword, triggering the effects of his hypnotherapy. Shaggy defeats the biker gang in a brawl and agrees to a motorcycle race. However, Shaggy hears the keyword while parting ways with the bikers, returning him to his original state of mind.

As Velma plans a dinner date with Windsor, Daphne and Fred find a mining company van and witness company members meddling around the handcar Scooby escaped on and retrieving a dinosaur tooth. Shaggy learns from Daphne how to ride a motorcycle, and just before the race starts hears the keyword. Gang leader Tex almost falls off a cliff but is saved by Shaggy, who earns Tex's respect in the process. The race is later interrupted by the phantosaur.

Daphne, Fred, and Velma notice the same mining company van from earlier, which now has attached cables that leave tracks similar to the tracks that they saw at the entrance of the dig. They and the bikers flood the van, revealing that the phantosaurs are actually animatronics used to scare the paleontologists away so as to retrieve a vein of silver.

Mr. Hubley tells the gang that his equipment for hypnosis was stolen. The gang follows some velociraptors into town to encounter a seemingly different phantosaur before it disappears. The next day, they present Professor Svankmajer with photos and find out that her camp was attacked. She lies to them about having sent Winsor home and intends to leave herself.

The gang learns that the velociraptors are graduate students in costume, the new phantosaur is a projection made by Professor Svankmajer and Winsor from Mr. Hubley's stolen equipment, and its fire breath is from the super-heated air of paint strippers. The paleontologists had found a dinosaur preserved in a quartz crystal and wanted to scare away townspeople to secretly claim it for themselves. One of the paint strippers activates the explosives that the paleontologists planted to collapse the caves, and they and the gang are forced to travel deeper into the mines, led by a confident Shaggy after he hears the keyword. Near an exit to the cave, Daphne says the keyword, reinstating Shaggy's cowardice. Scooby realizes the keyword is "bad", but struggles to say it because of his speech impediment. Shaggy, out of trance, nimbly escapes the cave and finds Tex's gang, having arrived to rescue the group.

The police arrest Professor Svankmajer and Winsor. Shaggy, along with the rest of Mystery Inc., receives hypnotherapy that returns him back to his usual self, causing the whole gang to think that each of them is Shaggy.

Voice cast
 Frank Welker as Scooby-Doo, Fred Jones and misc. bikers
 Matthew Lillard as Shaggy Rogers and Shaky Joe
 Mindy Cohn as Velma Dinkley
 Grey DeLisle as Daphne Blake
 Cathy Cavadini as Faith
 John DiMaggio as Fritz, GPS and misc. bikers
 Michael Gough as Mr. Babbit, Blair, Grad Student #1 and misc. bikers
 Matthew Gray Gubler as Winsor
 Finola Hughes as Professor Svankmajer
 Maulik Pancholy as Doctor
 Kevin Michael Richardson as Tex, Cop #2, Grad Student #3 and misc. bikers
 Fred Willard as Mr. Hubley
 Dave Wittenberg as Cop #1, Grad Student #2, Policeman and misc. bikers
 Gwendoline Yeo as Ms. Detich

Reception
Common Sense Media gave it 3 out of 5 stars, but said that it was " is too spooky for young kids" recommending it for ages 7 and over.

Ultra Instinct Shaggy meme
On October 12, 2017, YouTube user Midya uploaded a video titled "Ultra Instinct Shaggy," consisting of an edited scene from the film of Shaggy fighting Tex's biker gang. The title is in reference to the anime series Dragon Ball Super, from which the Ultra Instinct form (a powered-up state where the user can react to attacks instinctively) originated; the video makes use of the "Kyūkyoku no Battle" track and slows down the footage at certain points so that Shaggy appears to have gained the power. It quickly went viral and became part of a wave of memes depicting Shaggy with superhuman abilities, often requiring only a small percentage of his power to perform inhuman tasks or defeat ostensibly more powerful opponents. Variations of the meme use frames from a behind-the-scenes featurette of the 2002 film Scooby-Doo with fake subtitles describing Shaggy's power.

The meme's popularity coincided with the development of Mortal Kombat 11, and a petition consequently launched on Change.org to include Shaggy as DLC. The petition received thousands of signatures and received the attention of Mortal Kombat co-creator Ed Boon and Shaggy's voice actor Matthew Lillard. Lillard also tweeted posts and retweeted fan art in support of the idea and Boon jokingly petitioned to include Scooby-Doo in Injustice 2. It was later confirmed that Shaggy would not appear in any Mortal Kombat games. 

The meme was referenced in the animated film Mortal Kombat Legends: Battle of the Realms. During its intro, Shaggy, surrounded by a glowing aura, appears from the Warner Bros. Animation logo and grabs Scorpion, referencing the latter's catchphrase and attacks. It is later referenced in the video game MultiVersus, wherein Shaggy is featured as a playable character; he is depicted as having obtained superhuman powers, and some of his lines reference the meme, including a verbatim quote from the film.

References

External links

 

2011 television films
2011 films
2011 animated films
Scooby-Doo direct-to-video animated films
Animated films about dinosaurs
American television films
2010s American animated films
Films directed by Ethan Spaulding
Film and television memes
Internet memes
Internet memes introduced in 2017
American children's animated comedy films
2010s children's animated films
American children's animated mystery films
2010s English-language films